Al-Asfar Lake (Arabic: بحيرة الأصفر), also known as Asfar, Alasfar and Yellow Lake. Al-Asfar is located to the East of Umran city, in Al-Hasa, Eastern Saudi Arabia. The lake is surrounded by sand dunes and somewhat difficult to reach. Al-Asfar lake is one of the important wetland shallow lake in the region. The lake is a historic landmark of Al-Hasa, and was mentioned by some historians of the Abbasid and Islamic Golden Era such as Al-Hamawi, Al-Qalqashandi and Al-Zamakhshari. In the present time, The primary source of lake water is agricultural drainage water, which made some to refer to it as man-made. in 2019, Yellow Lake was declared national nature reserve.

History 
The lake has been mentioned by several historians such as Al-Hamawi and Al-Qalqashandi. The lake is also mentioned by Al-Zamakhshari in his book "Kitab al-Amkinah wa al-Jibal wa al-Miyah "  , where he describes it as peaceful lake at gates of Al-Hasa. Al-Zamakhshari suggests that the naming of the historical region of Bahrayn (which includes present time Eastern Arabia and Bahrain and translates to English as the "two Seas") comes from its location between The Green Sea and a peaceful lake at Alhasa.

Wildlife 
Different parts of the lake reflect different type of shores that include Wet, moist, semi-dry and dry zones. The different zones may have different plant species. There are at least 39 plant species belonging to 20 families that can be identified around the lake. Fluctuating water level create very diverse conditions, which enhances the vegetation and plant species and types. Fluctuating water levels allow some vegetation types to regenerate from buried seeds.

Al-Asfar Lake attract migratory birds twice a year. Birds migrate from cooler places such as  Russia, Canada, India and Iran to warmer climate areas including Al-Asfar Lake. The range of birds varies from small birds such as Sparrows to large birds such as geese and ducks.

Environmental concerns 
The lake water is contaminated with heavy metals, which mainly comes from agricultural water. The heavy metal level is generally higher than the international permissible limits and varies seasonally.

UNESCO site 
In 2018, Al-Ahsa Oasis became the fifth Saudi site to be registered on the UNESCO world heritage. Al-Asfar lake is one of 12 sites that were designated as world heritage site within Al-Hasa.

References 

World Heritage Sites in Asia
Nature reserves in Saudi Arabia
Lakes of Saudi Arabia